Chao Sukkhasoem (also spelled Souka-Seum, Suk Soem or Sukha-Söm; ; 1797–23 September 1850) was the king of Luang Phrabang from 1839 to 1850. 

He was the eldest son of Manthaturath. Before his succession he was taken as hostage in Bangkok. After his father's death, he was not allowed to return until 1838. He was crowned the king in 1839.

During his reign, Luang Phrabang put down a rebellion by the Tai Lue of Sipsong Panna. He died on 23 September 1850, succeeded by his younger brother Chantharath.

References

|-

Kings of Luang Phrabang
1797 births
1850 deaths
18th-century Laotian people
19th-century Laotian people